Micranthocereus streckeri is a species of plant in the family Cactaceae. It is endemic to Brazil.  Its natural habitats are subtropical or tropical moist shrubland and rocky areas. It is threatened by habitat loss.

References

Flora of Brazil
streckeri
Critically endangered plants
Taxonomy articles created by Polbot